This is a list of list of Franco-Belgian comic magazines. Belgium and France have a long tradition in comics. They have a common history for comics (see Franco-Belgian comics) and magazines.

In the early years of its history, magazines had a large place on the comics market and were often the only place where comics were published. Most of them were kids-targeted.

In the 1970s, satirical and more adult publications begun to appear. In the 1990s, there was a large pallet of comics magazine.  In the late 1990s, some notable comics have disappeared and only a few remain.

Famous magazines 
 (A SUIVRE) (Casterman) English: (TO BE CONTINUED)
February 1, 1978 - December 1, 1997
 BoDoï (LZ Publications) 
September 20, 1997 - still published
 Bravo (Jean Meewissen)
December 1940 - April 1951
 Canal BD Magazine (Canal BD)
October 1997 – Present. Still published.
 Charlie Hebdo (Editions du Square, Kalachnikof) English: Charlie Weekly
1st run: November 1970 - December 1981; 2nd run: July 1992
 Charlie Mensuel (Editions du Square, Dargaud) English: Charlie Monthly
1st run: February 1, 1969 - September 1, 1981; 2nd run: April 1, 1982 - February 1, 1986
 Circus (Glénat)
 April 1, 1975 - September 1, 1989
 Coeurs Vaillants  (UOCF) English: The Valiant Hearts
 December 8, 1929 - October 1, 1963
 Corto (Casterman)
 May 25, 1985 - November 20, 1989
 L'Écho des Savannes (Albin Michel) English: The Echo of the Savannahs
1st run: May 1, 1972 - January 1, 1982; 2nd run: November 1, 1982 - December 1, 2006
 Ferraille (Les Requins-Marteaux)
 October 1996–Present. Still (but irregularly) published.
 Fluide Glacial (Audie) English: Frozen Liquid
 May 1, 1975 - still published
 Gomme!
 November 15, 1981 - January 15, 1984
 Hara-Kiri (Editions du Square, SELD, Société Française de Revue)
Hara-Kiri Hebdo (weekly), 1st run: February 1969 - November 1970; 2nd run :1993; 3rd run: 1996
Hara-Kiri Mensuel (monthly), 1st run: September 1960 - December 1985; 2nd run: 1986 - 1987; 3rd run: 1988; 4th run: 1988 - 1990; 5th run: January -March 1993, 6th run: April 1996
 Héroïc Albums (Edition Esseo)
 1945- December 1956
 Le Journal de Mickey (Opera Mundi, Hachette)(English : Mickey's Newspaper) (Walt Disney's Comics and Stories French homologue)
1st run: October 21, 1934 - July, 1944; 2nd run: June 1952
 Lanfeust Mag (Soleil Prod.)
 May 1998–Present. Still published.
 Métal Hurlant (Les Humanoïdes Associés, Hachette) English: Screaming Metal
1st run: January 1, 1975 - July 1, 1987; 2nd run: July 3, 2002 - October 3, 2004
 Pavillon Rouge (Editions Delcoutr) English: Red Pennant
 May 2001 - July 2003
 Petits Belges (Editions Bonne Presse) English: Little Belgians
 January 4, 1920 - December 4, 1960
 Pif gadget (Pif edition)
1st run: February 1969 - January 1994; 2nd run: July 2004
 Le Petit Vingtième (Le Journal du Vingtième Siècle) English: literally The Little Twentieth, this was a children's offshoot of Le Journal du Vigntième Siècle, English: The Journal of the Twentieth Century 
 November 1, 1928 - May 9, 1940
 Pilote (Dargaud) English:  Pilot
 weekly: October 29, 1959 - May 30, 1974; monthly: June 5, 1974 - December 1, 1986
 Record (Bonne Presse, Bayard Presse)
1st run: January, 1962 - December, 1971; 2nd run: January, 1972 - December, 1973; 3rd run: January 1974 - July 1976
 Spirou magazine (Dupuis)
April 21, 1938 - still published
Tchô! (Glenat)
 September 1998; monthly;  still published
 Tintin magazine
 Belgian edition: September 26, 1948 - December 23, 1980
 French edition, 1st run: October 28, 1948 - January 4, 1973; 2nd run: September 16, 1975 - May 30, 1978; merged with Belgian edition
  Le Trombone Illustré (Spirou magazine supplement, Dupuis)
 March 17, 1977 - October 20, 1977
 Vaillant (Éditions Vaillant)
 June 1945 - February 1969; became Pif gadget
 Vécu (Glénat)
 March 1, 1985 - still published

References 

 BDoubliées magazine indexes 

Comics magazines
Magazines published in France
 
 
Bandes dessinées
Comic mag